Kanzem is a municipality in the Trier-Saarburg district, in Rhineland-Palatinate, Germany.

The winery Weingut von Othegraven, which is organized in the Association of German Prädikat Wine Estates (VDP), is located in this village. Günther Jauch is its owner.

History
From 18 July 1946 to 6 June 1947 Kanzem, in its then municipal boundary, formed part of the Saar Protectorate.

References

Trier-Saarburg